The Portuguese Falcon is a 2015 Portuguese superhero comedy film directed by João Leitão. It was released on April 23, 2015.

Synopsis
Captain Falcão tells the story of a Portuguese superhero serving António de Oliveira Salazar in the fight against the communist "red menace" during the 1960s, mercilessly satirizing both the anti-communist propaganda of the Estado Novo and the left-leaning politics of the Armed Forces Movement.

Cast
 as Capitão Falcão
David Chan as Puto Perdiz
José Pinto as António de Oliveira Salazar
Rui Mendes
Luís Vicente as Vladimir Lenin
Miguel Guilherme as General Gaivota
Carla Maciel
Bruno Nogueira
Nuno Lopes
Ricardo Carriço

Production
The film was shot in Santarém and Lisbon.

Reception
The film received great critical acclaim.

References

External links
 

2015 action comedy films
2010s adventure comedy films
Films set in Portugal
Films set in the 1960s
Films shot in Lisbon
Films shot in Santarém, Portugal
Portuguese action adventure films
2015 films
2010s superhero comedy films
2010s action adventure films
2010s Portuguese-language films